The 2006 All-Ireland Minor Football Championship was the 75th staging of the All-Ireland Minor Football Championship, the Gaelic Athletic Association's premier inter-county Gaelic football tournament for boys under the age of 18.

Down entered the championship as defending champions, however, they were defeated by Cavan in the Ulster preliminary round.

On 23 September 2006, Roscommon won the championship following a 1-10 to 0-9 defeat of Kerry in the All-Ireland final. This was their fourth All-Ireland title overall and their first title in 55 championship seasons.

Results

Connacht Minor Football Championship

Rob Robin

Semi-Finals

Final

Leinster Minor Football Championship

Rob Robin

Quarter-Final

Semi-Finals

Final

Munster Minor Football Championship

Quarter-Finals

Semi-Finals

Final

Ulster Minor Football Championship

Rob Robin

Quarter-Finals

Semi-Final

Final

All-Ireland Minor Football Championship
Quarter-finals

Semi-finals

Finals

References

2006
All-Ireland Minor Football Championship